Dalkeith is a historic plantation house located near Arcola, Warren County, North Carolina.  It was built about 1825, and is a two-story, late Federal style, temple-form frame dwelling.  It has a gable roof and brick basement. The front facade features a pedimented entrance porch, with four fluted Doric order columns.  The house is similar in style to Elgin. During the American Civil War Asa Biggs took refuge at Dalkeith, where he wrote his autobiography.

It was listed on the National Register of Historic Places in 1974.

References

Plantation houses in North Carolina
Houses on the National Register of Historic Places in North Carolina
Federal architecture in North Carolina
Houses completed in 1825
Houses in Warren County, North Carolina
National Register of Historic Places in Warren County, North Carolina